Hibbertia glaberrima is a species of flowering plant in the family Dilleniaceae and is endemic to Central Australia. It is a glabrous, spreading shrub with oblong to lance-shaped leaves and yellow flowers borne singly in upper leaf axils, with 30 to 150 stamens arranged around three carpels.

Description
There are 30 to 150 stamens arranged around the three glabrous carpels, each carpel with six to nine ovules. Flowering occurs in most months with a peak from July to September.

Taxonomy
Hibbertia glaberrima was first formally described in 1862 by Ferdinand von Mueller in  Fragmenta phytographiae Australiae. The specific epithet (glaberrima) means "wholly glabrous".

Distribution and habitat
Hibbertia glaberrima grows on rocky or gravelly ranges in the Pilbara biogeographic region of Western Australia, the far north-west of South Australia and in the southern part of the Northern Territory.

Conservation status
Hibbertia glaberrima is listed as "not threatened" by the Government of Western Australia Department of Parks and Wildlife.

References

glaberrima
Eudicots of Western Australia
Flora of South Australia
Flora of the Northern Territory
Plants described in 1862
Taxa named by Ferdinand von Mueller